Melampodium leucanthum, the plains blackfoot or blackfoot daisy, is an herbaceous perennial plant in the family Asteraceae found on limestone-containing rocky slopes in the Sonoran Desert. It is an attractive ornamental with showy flowers and long bloom period, from March to November.

References

Millerieae
Flora of the Sonoran Deserts